Ascra or Askre was a town in ancient Boeotia which is best known today as the home of the poet Hesiod. It was located upon Mount Helicon, five miles west of Thespiae. According to a lost poetic Atthis by one Hegesinous, a maiden by the name of Ascra lay with Poseidon and bore a son Oeoclus  who, together with the Aloadae, founded the town named for his mother. In the Works and Days, Hesiod says that his father was driven from Aeolian Cyme to Ascra by poverty, only to find himself situated in a most unpleasant town (lines 639–40):

The 4th century BCE astronomer Eudoxus thought even less of Ascra's climate. However, other writers speak of Ascra as abounding in corn, and in wine. 

By the time Eudoxus wrote, the town had been all but destroyed (by Thespiae sometime between 700 and 650 BCE), a loss commemorated by a similarly lost Hellenistic poem, which opened: "Of Ascra there isn't even a trace anymore". This apparently was a hyperbole, for in the 2nd century CE, Pausanias could report that a single tower, though not much else, still stood at the site.

Notes

Cities in ancient Boeotia
Populated places in ancient Boeotia
Former populated places in Greece